Sahar Dolatshahi (born October 8, 1979) is an Iranian actress. She is best known for her acting in Ice Age (2015), Istanbul Junction (2018), The Frog (2020–2021) and I Want to Live (2021). She has received various accolades, including two Crystal Simorgh and an Iran's Film Critics and Writers Association Award.

Early life 
She is a graduate of the Department of Dramatic and Translational Literature in French. She began her acting career in the theater.

Career 
In the film Gold and Copper directed by Homayoun Asadiyan in 2011, she was nominated for Best Actress in a Supporting Role at the 14th Iran Cinema Celebration. In the 33rd Fajr Film Festival, Dolatshahi won a Crystal Simorgh for best actress in a supporting role in the film Ice Age. The film 180° Rule starring Dolatshahi and directed by Farnoush Samadi received an award at 65th Valladolid International Film Festival for the Best Film of Meeting Point section.

Filmography

Film

Web

Television

Other Works

Theatre

Awards and nominations

References

External links

 
 

1979 births
Living people
People from Tehran
Audiobook narrators
Actresses from Tehran
Iranian film actresses
Soore University alumni
Iranian stage actresses
Iranian television actresses
Islamic Azad University alumni
20th-century Iranian women artists
21st-century Iranian women artists
Crystal Simorgh for Best Supporting Actress winners